MSY Wind Surf is a five-mast staysail schooner that is one of the largest sailing cruise ships in the world, with two electric propulsion motors powered by four diesel electric generating sets also. She can carry up to 342 passengers, in a total of 150 ocean-view staterooms, 18 ocean-view suites and 2 deluxe bridge suites, with a crew of 210. Wind Surf had been owned and operated by Club Med under the name Club , and was later transferred to Windstar Cruises.

In January 2022, during the COVID-19 pandemic that started in 2020, 48 crew members and 51 passengers of the 342-passenger ship tested positive for covid and were taken off the ship for quarantine in Barbados; later many other passengers tested positive and were unable to return home until they tested negative.

History
Her sister ship Club Med 2 was launched in 1992 in the same shipyard. Club Med 1 made her maiden voyage in 1990, and sailed for Club Med for eight years.

In 1998, Club Med 1 was sold to Windstar Cruises and renamed Wind Surf. The ship was based on Windstar Cruises' smaller 5,350-ton, 148-passenger Wind Star, Wind Spirit and Wind Song motor sailing yachts. All were also built by Société Nouvelle des Ateliers et Chantiers du Havre, France.

See also
List of large sailing vessels

References

External links

1989 ships
Cruise ships
Five-masted ships
Ships built in France